Fortune and Men's Eyes is the debut album from Jennifer Hall and was released in 1987. The song "Ice Cream Days" also appears on the soundtrack of the film Bright Lights, Big City.

Album title 
The title is taken from William Shakespeare's Sonnet 29 which begins with the line "When in disgrace with fortune and men's eyes".

Track listing

LP: 1-25628 / CD: 9 25628-2

Personnel 
Jennifer Hall - Vocals
Alan Tarney - Guitar, Keyboards, Programming

Backing vocals
Tessa Niles (1, 2, 3, 5, 6, 7)
Alan Tarney (1, 4, 8, 9, 10)

Production
Alan Tarney - Producer
Gerry W. Kitchingham - Recording Engineer
John Hudson - Mixing engineer

Recorded at RG Jones, Wimbledon. Mixed at Mayfair Studios, London

Artwork
Robert Erdmann - Front cover photo
Philippe Costes - Back cover photo
Jeri Heiden - Art direction
Kim Champagne - Design
Two Guys from Melbourne - Front cover type

References 

1987 debut albums
Warner Records albums
Albums produced by Alan Tarney